Liselotte Landbeck (13 January 1916 – 15 February 2013) was an Austrian athlete who competed at a high level in both figure skating and speed skating in the 1930s. In figure skating, she won the bronze medal at the  1934 World Championships.

In speed skating, Landbeck competed at the first ever international long track speed skating competition for women during the 1932 European Speed Skating Championships in Davos on 9–10 January 1932. She won this competition against Dutchwomen Elly Taconis by setting a new world record in the 500m as well as the world record in the 1000 m. Landbeck won the next season the first unofficial 1933 World Allround Speed Skating Championships for Women.

Although she originally was from Vienna, in 1935, she married the Belgian figure skater Robert Verdun and moved to that country. She represented Belgium in the 1936 Winter Olympics.

Competitive highlights (figure skating)

References

 Skatabase
 
 
 

1916 births
2013 deaths
Figure skaters from Vienna
Austrian female single skaters
Austrian female speed skaters
Belgian female single skaters
Olympic figure skaters of Belgium
Figure skaters at the 1936 Winter Olympics
World record setters in speed skating
World Figure Skating Championships medalists
European Figure Skating Championships medalists
World Allround Speed Skating Championships medalists
Immigrants to Belgium
Austrian emigrants